Suradech Thongchai (born April 19, 1987) is a professional footballer from Thailand.

Honours

Club
Bangkok Glass F.C.
 Thai FA Cup winner (1) : 2014

External links
Profile at Thaipremierleague.co.th

1987 births
Living people
Suradech Thongchai
Suradech Thongchai
Association football midfielders
Suradech Thongchai
Suradech Thongchai
Suradech Thongchai
Suradech Thongchai
Suradech Thongchai
Suradech Thongchai